Cynthia Preston, sometimes credited as Cyndy Preston (born May 18, 1968), is a Canadian actress.

Life and career
Preston was born in Toronto, Ontario. She made her screen debut in the 1986 television film Miles to Go... playing Jill Clayburgh' daughter. She appeared in a number of Canadian television dramas the following years, include Night Heat, Diamonds, The Hitchhiker, and Street Legal. She played the female leading roles in horror films Pin (1988),  (1988), and Prom Night III: The Last Kiss (1989).

Preston starred in the 1994 award-winning comedy-drama film Whale Music opposite Maury Chaykin. In 1999, she starred in the Showtime science fiction series Total Recall 2070 alongside Michael Easton. The series was canceled after single season of 22 episodes. She guest-starred on The X-Files, Andromeda, CSI: Crime Scene Investigation, Two and a Half Men, Bones, Flashpoint and Hannibal. From 2002 to 2005 she played Faith Rosco in the American daytime soap opera General Hospital.

Preston appeared in the 2013 supernatural horror film Carrie directed by Kimberly Peirce. She starred in a more than ten Lifetime television movies, including The Love of Her Life (2008), Dead at 17 (2008), A Sister's Secret (2009), The Wife He Met Online (2012), A Nanny's Revenge (2012), The Secret Sex Life of a Single Mom (2014), Stalked by a Reality Star (2018), and The Cheerleader Escort (2019).

Filmography

References

External links 
 
 Biography of Cynthia Preston
 

Canadian film actresses
Canadian soap opera actresses
Canadian television actresses
Canadian voice actresses
Living people
20th-century Canadian actresses
21st-century Canadian actresses
1968 births
Canadian expatriates in the United States